Mark Bostridge is a British writer and critic, known for his historical biographies.

He was educated at Westminster School and read Modern History at St Anne's College, Oxford, from 1979 to 1984. At Oxford, he was awarded the Gladstone Memorial Prize. After university he worked for a time for Shirley Williams, then President of the SDP. Later he worked for BBC Television.

His first book was Vera Brittain: A Life, co-written with Paul Berry and published in 1995. This biography of the writer and peace campaigner Vera Brittain was shortlisted for the two major non-fiction prizes of its day, the Whitbread Prize and the NCR Book Award as well as the Fawcett Prize.  Bostridge's next Brittain project was a collaboration with Alan Bishop.  Their edition of her letters was published in 1998 as Letters from a Lost Generation, and Bostridge adapted the letters for a BBC Radio Four series starring Amanda Root as Brittain and Rupert Graves as Roland Leighton, who was killed in the First World War.

Bostridge's Lives For Sale, an anthology of biographers' tales, was published in 2004.  In 2008 he published Florence Nightingale: The Woman and Her Legend, the first major biography of Florence Nightingale in over half a century, which was awarded the 2009 Elizabeth Longford Prize for Historical Biography and named as a Wall Street Journal Best Book of 2008 and an Atlantic Magazine top book of the year. 'It will not be superseded for generations', wrote the reviewer in the Daily Telegraph 

In 2008, Bostridge also published Because You Died, a selection of Vera Brittain's First World War poetry and prose, to mark the ninetieth anniversary of the Armistice. In May 2009 Screen Daily reported that he was working closely with BBC Films on a screen adaptation of Brittain's Testament of Youth. In December 2014 Bostridge's study Vera Brittain and the First World War, containing new research about Testament of Youth'''s evolution, and an account of the dramatisations of the book culminating in the new film version starring Alicia Vikander as Vera Brittain and Kit Harington as Roland Leighton, was published by Bloomsbury.

In January 2014, Penguin UK published Bostridge's The Fateful Year, a portrait of England in 1914: "a year that started in peace and ended in war". The book was shortlisted for the PEN Hessell-Tiltman Prize for History in 2015.

In June 2016 Bostridge was one of a group of biographers, historians, and other academics who signed a letter to The Times protesting at the erection of a statue to Mary Seacole at St Thomas' Hospital in London. In interviews Bostridge explained that he was not opposed to a statue to Seacole, but to the siting of it at the hospital where Florence Nightingale founded her nurse training school in 1860, influencing the development of nursing throughout the world. Bostridge argues that Seacole was not a "pioneer nurse" as some of the statue campaigners maintain. He also points to the way in which Nightingale's enormous contributions to public health are now commonly and mistakenly attributed to Seacole by a wide range of British institutions that, he says, should "frankly know better".

In an article published in the Times Literary Supplement in January 2020, Bostridge revealed that he has recently donated his diary to the Bodleian Library in Oxford.

He is a brother of the tenor Ian Bostridge. They are the great-grandsons of the Millwall goalkeeper, John "Tiny" Joyce.

ReferencesIndependent on Sunday'' article on Mark Bostridge and Florence Nightingale, 28 September 2008

1960 births
English biographers
Living people
People educated at Westminster School, London
Alumni of St Anne's College, Oxford